The meridian 41° east of Greenwich is a line of longitude that extends from the North Pole across the Arctic Ocean, Europe, Asia, Africa, the Indian Ocean, the Southern Ocean, and Antarctica to the South Pole.

Part of the border between Kenya and Somalia runs about 1 km west of the meridian, parallel to it.

The 41st meridian east forms a great circle with the 139th meridian west.

From Pole to Pole
Starting at the North Pole and heading south to the South Pole, the 41st meridian east passes through:

{| class="wikitable plainrowheaders"
! scope="col" width="115" | Co-ordinates
! scope="col" width="195" | Country, territory or sea
! scope="col" | Notes
|-
| style="background:#b0e0e6;" | 
! scope="row" style="background:#b0e0e6;" | Arctic Ocean
| style="background:#b0e0e6;" |
|-
| style="background:#b0e0e6;" | 
! scope="row" style="background:#b0e0e6;" | Barents Sea
| style="background:#b0e0e6;" |
|-
| 
! scope="row" | 
| Kola Peninsula
|-
| style="background:#b0e0e6;" | 
! scope="row" style="background:#b0e0e6;" | White Sea
| style="background:#b0e0e6;" |
|-
| 
! scope="row" | 
|
|-valign="top"
| 
! scope="row" |  or 
| Abkhazia is a partially recognised state. Most nations consider its territory to be part of Georgia.
Passing through Sukhumi.
|-
| style="background:#b0e0e6;" | 
! scope="row" style="background:#b0e0e6;" | Black Sea
| style="background:#b0e0e6;" |
|-
| 
! scope="row" | 
|
|-
| 
! scope="row" | 
|
|-
| 
! scope="row" | 
|
|-
| 
! scope="row" | 
|
|-
| style="background:#b0e0e6;" | 
! scope="row" style="background:#b0e0e6;" | Red Sea
| style="background:#b0e0e6;" |
|-
| 
! scope="row" | 
| Dahlak Archipelago
|-
| style="background:#b0e0e6;" | 
! scope="row" style="background:#b0e0e6;" | Red Sea
| style="background:#b0e0e6;" |
|-
| 
! scope="row" | 
|
|-
| 
! scope="row" | 
|
|-
| 
! scope="row" | 
|
|-valign="top"
| 
! scope="row" | 
| The meridian runs parallel to the border with Kenya, which is about 1 km to the west
|-
| 
! scope="row" | 
| Mainland and Pate Island
|-
| style="background:#b0e0e6;" | 
! scope="row" style="background:#b0e0e6;" | Indian Ocean
| style="background:#b0e0e6;" | Passing just east of the  coast
|-
| style="background:#b0e0e6;" | 
! scope="row" style="background:#b0e0e6;" | Southern Ocean
| style="background:#b0e0e6;" |
|-
| 
! scope="row" | Antarctica
| Queen Maud Land, claimed by 
|-
|}

See also
40th meridian east
42nd meridian east

e041 meridian east
Kenya–Somalia border